Josh Warren is an American actor, best known for portraying the lead in the Atom TV series M'Larky, as well as his role as Rich in the Footloose remake. As of June 2017 he is the executive producer of Action Show Programming Network.

In 2019, Action Show Studios signed on to produce the fantasy, comedy web series "The Campaign" with Josh directing and editing episodes.  In later 2020, "The Campaign" signed with streaming service The Fantasy Network.  The first five episodes of "The Campaign" will being streaming in February 2022.

Filmography

Film

Television

External links 

 

1979 births
American male television actors
Living people